Zhang Yue (born 30 September 1990) is a female Chinese football player who is a goalkeeper.

References

External links 
 

1990 births
Living people
Women's association football goalkeepers
Chinese women's footballers
China women's international footballers
2015 FIFA Women's World Cup players
Footballers at the 2016 Summer Olympics
Footballers from Tianjin
Footballers at the 2010 Asian Games
Footballers at the 2014 Asian Games
Olympic footballers of China
Asian Games competitors for China